Philip Ranulph de Glanville (born 1 October 1968 in Loughborough) is a former English rugby union player who played at centre for Bath and England.

Rugby career
de Glanville played for Durham University while an Economics and Politics student, then at Oxford University won a Blue with Oxford University RFC and also represented England U21s and England Students.

de Glanville joined Bath in 1989 and captained them to a league and cup double in 1996, partnering Jeremy Guscott in the centre for this club that season, as well as many others. He played 201 times for Bath over a 12-year career, scoring 53 tries. He started for Bath in the victorious 1998 Heineken Cup Final as they defeated Brive.

He made his England debut as a replacement in the match against the Springboks in 1992. Many of de Glanville's international caps were earned in a replacement role, as the incumbent centres were Will Carling (long-serving England captain) and Jeremy Guscott. De Glanville is seen as likely to have won many more caps if it weren't for this firmly entrenched Carling-Guscott combination, a pairing solidified by early Carling-Guscott successes like the 1991 Rugby World Cup.

In the Autumn of 1996 coach Jack Rowell appointed him as England captain following Will Carling's decision to step-down, following England's 1996 Five Nations Championship win. However, there was criticism of his inclusion in the starting XV for the 1997 Five Nations as it wasn't felt that he was in good enough form to be guaranteed a place in the team. He was not selected for that summer's Lions tour to South Africa losing his place to uncapped Will Greenwood. Under new coach Clive Woodward in autumn 1997 he lost both the captaincy to Lawrence Dallaglio and his starting position to Greenwood, though he remained a valued squad member. He showed some very good form in the 1999 world cup, particularly in the pool game against New Zealand. In total he won 38 caps for England and started in the centre throughout the 1994/1995 season, including an outstanding performance in the first tour to South Africa after apartheid, where he played in both test matches. He was involved in over 60 England match day squads

After rugby
Chiding his renowned good-looks, teammates often referred to de Glanville as "Hollywood"; a trait seemingly incongruous with his hard, committed playing style.

In 2003 he competed in the BBC's Superstars television show, winning the kayaking and golf events but eventually coming last in the final. He was a regional member of Sport England and from 2012 to 2015 was the Director of Elite Sport at Hartpury College. He went into executive search with Hanover Fox UK in 2015 and is one of the three current owners of the business having bought it in 2019.

De Glanville lives in Bath, UK.

He is the father of rugby player Tom de Glanville.

References

External links
 Scrum.com player statistics
 Sporting Heroes
 Sporting Heroes
 Sporting Heroes
 

1968 births
Living people
Alumni of St Catherine's College, Oxford
Alumni of University College, Durham
Barbarian F.C. players
Bath Rugby players
Durham University RFC players
England international rugby union players
English rugby union players
Oxford University RFC players
People educated at Bryanston School
Rugby union centres
Rugby union players from Loughborough
People educated at Mount House School, Tavistock